Cyanopica is a genus of magpie in the family Corvidae. They belong to a common lineage with the genus Perisoreus. The generic name is derived from the Latin words cyanos, meaning "lapis lazuli", and pica, meaning "magpie".

Species

References

 
Bird genera
Taxa named by Charles Lucien Bonaparte